Karl Birger Vodahl Gotaas (22 July 1883 – 14 June 1960) was a Norwegian journalist, newspaper editor and non-fiction writer.

Career
Gotaas was born in Minnesota on 22 July 1883. He edited the newspapers Stavangeren and Bergens Aftenblad, and headed Høyres Pressekontor from 1925 to 1950. During the Norwegian Campaign in 1940 he was press officer for the Norwegian general staff, and wrote the book  in 1945. Gotaas served as secretary general for the Conservative Party from 1945 to 1946.

References

1883 births
1960 deaths
People from Minnesota
Norwegian newspaper editors
Norwegian Army personnel of World War II